Chakravakam  is a 1974 Telugu drama film directed by V. Madhusudhana Rao and produced by D. Ramanaidu on Suresh Productions banner. It starred Sobhan Babu, Vanisri, S. V. Ranga Rao, Chandrakala. The film is based on the novel Chakravakam written by Koduri Kausalya Devi.

Cast
 Sobhan Babu as Kiran
 Vanisree as Devarani
 Chandrakala as Indrani
 S. V. Ranga Rao as Dharma Rayudu
Anjali Devi
 Nagabhushanam as Jagapati
G. Varalakshmi
 Allu Ramalingaiah as Nageshwaraiah
 Krishna Kumari
 Rajasulochana as Janaki
 Padmanabham as Sriram
 Sreedhar as Diwakar
Rajababu
D. Ramanaidu
 K.V. Chalam

Soundtrack
 "Ee Nadila Naa Hrudayam Parugulu Teestundi" (Singers: V. Ramakrishna and P. Susheela)
 "Kothaga Pellaina Kurravaniki Pattapagale Tondara" (Singers: V. Ramakrishna and P. Susheela)
 "Veenaleni Teeganu Neevuleni Bratukunu" (Singers: V. Ramakrishna and P. Susheela)
 "Veenalona Teegalona Ekkadunnadi Ragamu" (Singer: P. Susheela)

Boxoffice
The film ran successfully for 200 days in Hyderabad.

References

External links
 

1974 films
Films directed by V. Madhusudhana Rao
Films scored by K. V. Mahadevan
1970s Telugu-language films
Suresh Productions films